The Hitch-Hiker is a radio play written by Lucille Fletcher. It was first presented on the November 17, 1941, broadcast of The Orson Welles Show on CBS Radio, featuring a score written and conducted by Bernard Herrmann, Fletcher's first husband. Welles performed The Hitch-Hiker four times on radio, and the play was adapted for a notable 1960 episode of the television series The Twilight Zone.

In the story, a man on a cross country drive repeatedly notices the same hitch-hiker standing along the side of the road. Though the hitch-hiker's appearance is non-threatening, the driver becomes increasingly distressed upon inexplicably seeing him again and again across several states along his route. Eventually, the driver becomes too afraid to stop his car and even attempts to run the man down in terrified hysteria. After making a phone call home, however, he's shocked by news that completely changes his understanding of his predicament.

Plot
Ronald Adams is a young man embarking on a cross-country drive from his mother's home in Brooklyn to California. Minutes after getting underway in a steady rain, a hitch-hiker steps onto the road on the Brooklyn Bridge, forcing Adams to swerve to avoid him. He's momentarily irritated, but the incident slips his mind until he sees the same man hitch-hiking along the Pulaski Skyway in Pennsylvania. The coincidence is startling, and Adams is increasingly unsettled to spot the same man several more times across the mid-west. Though the man looks like an ordinary hitch-hiker, Adams cannot understand how he keeps passing him along his route, and he's especially unnerved to see fresh spots of rain on the man's raincoat even though it's been dry since leaving New York.

After two particularly distressing encounters at a detour and a lonely railroad crossing, Adams is reluctant to stop or rest. He's exhausted and desperate for company by the time he reaches Oklahoma, so he picks up a different hitch-hiker, a young woman heading to Amarillo, Texas. They make conversation until Adams sees the mysterious man again and almost crashes into a fence while attempting to run him down. Adams admits the reason for his sudden swerve to his startled passenger, who hadn't seen anyone on the side of the road. She flees his car in terror, and after she's picked up by a passing truck, a shaken Adams decides to take a nap before continuing. However, when he sees the mysterious man approaching from across an open field, he speeds away again.

The hitch-hiker appears even more frequently over the ensuing days as Adams races faster and faster through the western deserts, too afraid to pause for longer than it takes to refuel his car. Eventually he spots a payphone outside a campground in New Mexico and stops to call his mother, feeling that he can pull himself together upon hearing a familiar voice. However, he's confused when the phone at her residence is answered by a woman he doesn't recognize. After confirming that he has reached the correct number, the woman explains that Mrs. Adams was hospitalized with a nervous breakdown after the death of her son Ronald, who was killed six days ago in an automobile accident on the Brooklyn Bridge. Ronald Adams is too shocked to reply or insert more coins to continue the long distance conversation and the call drops., 

The play ends with Adams expressing a new-found determination to find the hitch-hiker: "Somewhere I will know who he is – and who I am."

Background

Immediately after their marriage in October 1939, Lucille Fletcher and Bernard Herrmann left New York for Hollywood, where Herrmann was to begin work on the score of Orson Welles's first feature film, Citizen Kane. They traveled cross-country several times by air and by train; but their most memorable trip was made in 1940, with Herrmann driving their Packard convertible. Fletcher saw "an odd-looking man, first on the Brooklyn Bridge and then on the Pulaski Skyway. We never saw him again. However, I didn't quite know what to do with the idea until a year later, when … I conceived the idea of doing it as a ghost story."

"The Hitch-Hiker was written for Orson Welles in the days when he was one of the master producers and actors in radio," Fletcher wrote in her preface to the published version of the radio play, which adapts it for the stage. "It was designed to provide a vehicle not only for his famous voice but for the original techniques of sound which became associated with his radio presentations. … Orson Welles and his group of Mercury Players made of this script a haunting study of the supernatural, which can still raise hackles along my own spine."

The music for The Hitch-Hiker – called "one of Herrmann's most chilling scores" by biographer Steven C. Smith – was used in all four radio presentations. It was also re-recorded as stock music that can be heard (usually uncredited) on the soundtracks of several CBS television series, including the 1960 Twilight Zone adaptation of The Hitch-Hiker. Herrmann's score (CBS Music Library VIII 56-D-1) is in the UCLA Music Library Special Collections.

"We really shared that story together," Fletcher said in a 1988 interview about Bernard Herrmann. "He was very interested in that story so he had to write the music for it."

Presentations
The Hitch-Hiker was first performed by Orson Welles on the November 17, 1941, broadcast of The Orson Welles Show on CBS Radio.  Welles also performed the radio play on Suspense (September 2, 1942), The Philip Morris Playhouse (October 16, 1942), and The Mercury Summer Theatre of the Air (June 21, 1946).

Adaptations

The Twilight Zone

Rod Serling adapted The Hitch-Hiker for the first season of his television anthology series The Twilight Zone for an episode originally broadcast on January 22, 1960. Serling's version mostly kept to the radio show plot with a few exceptions, most notably changing the driver to a young woman named Nan Adams (portrayed by Inger Stevens) and moving the fatal accident at the beginning of the story from the Brooklyn Bridge to a dusty road in rural Pennsylvania. When the teleplay was adapted for radio on The Twilight Zone Radio Dramas in 2002, the role of Nan Adams was played by Kate Jackson.

Other adaptions
In 2004, Mind City Productions adapted the Mercury Theater version of the radio play into an animated short film, adding animation directed by Michael Anthony Jackson to the original recording of the Mercury radio production.  This was intended to be the first in a series of animated adaptations of Mercury radio productions, although to date, this remains the only entry in the series.

In 2011, a short film adaptation of "Hitchhiker" was produced and directed by Lawrence Anthony.

In 2020, a fragment of Welles’ radio broadcast was sampled by Hip-Hop and R&B artist Logic to be part of the first track of his studio album, No Pressure.

References

External links
 The Hitch-Hiker – Suspense at the Internet Archive (September 2, 1942) 
 The Hitch-Hiker – The Mercury Theatre on the Air at the Internet Archive (June 21, 1946) 
 Herrmann Photo Tour including a photo of the title page of the score for The Hitch-Hiker (CBS Collection, UCLA). The Bernard Herrmann Papers, The Bernard Herrmann Society; retrieved June 24, 2012
  (The Twilight Zone, January 22, 1960)
  (2004)

American radio dramas
CBS Radio programs
1940s American radio programs
Orson Welles
Ghosts in written fiction
Fiction about hitchhiking